Hans Josef Schumm (né Johann Josef Eugen Schumm; 2 April 1896 Stuttgart – 2 February 1990 Los Angeles) was a German-born-turned-American actor, notably, a prolific and critically acclaimed Hollywood screen character actor who appeared in some 95 films – including a co-starring villainous role in a 12-episode serial.  He also appeared in 15 TV productions and several stage productions, including one on Broadway.  Except for about ten cinema productions, Schumm's  in cinema and television was filmed in the United States. On stage and in film, he is credited as Hans Josef Schumm or simply Hans Schumm; but in seven films, he is credited under the pseudonym André Pola — three in 1948, one in 1949, one in 1954, and one 1956.  In his private life, he was known as Joseph Schumm and Johann J.E. Schumm.

Career 
Schumm was born April 2, 1896, in Stuttgart, Germany.  Schumm served in the German Army during World War I.

While living in Stuttgart, Schumm first visited New York as a merchant at age , arriving January 1, 1924.  There are at least two attributions for his acting debut, one in 1925 in Meissen, Germany, and one around 1925 in Stuttgart, performing in The Merchant of Venice with Staatstheater Stuttgart. Schumm visited New York again, arriving November 30, 1926, and performed with a German stock company in Milwaukee and Chicago.

Permanent move to New York 
Schumm returned a third time to New York, arriving August 26, 1929, to work in German-language theater as a permanent United States resident.

The timing of Schumm's 1929 arrival was  before Hitler's seizure of power on January 30, 1933. Germany had been in the throes of severe economic duress from post World War I, which included hyperinflation that began around 1922.  His arrival was also  days after the Great Crash of 1929 on Wall Street.  The Great Depression had struck Germany hard in late 1929, and sunk to its trough in early 1932.

Shortly after arriving, until about 1931, Schumm lived at 160 Wadsworth Avenue, Washington Heights, a neighborhood in the most northern part of Manhattan, New York.

Move to Hollywood 
By 1931, Schumm was living in Los Angeles, and appeared in two 1932 productions at the Pasadena Community Playhouse.  Schumm debuted in cinema in 1933 as an uncredited bit part actor in The Song of Songs, starring Marlene Dietrich.

Die Reichskulturkammer of 1933 
Back in Germany, in 1933, by decree of Joseph Goebbels under a newly created agency called Die Reichskulturkammer (DKK), Jewish actors were, among other things, prohibited from performing on German stage. Schumm was not an exile.  But he worked within the Hollywood cinema community, particularly German expatriate groups, to help German Jewish exiled actors acclimate in American cinema.  In Los Angeles, in 1939, Schumm became one of 60 or more initial members who formed The Continental Players, a short-lived theater company spearheaded by film executives in support of exiled Jewish  from Germany and Austria.

World War II era 
Schumm's film roles were mostly minor and, during World War II, mostly uncredited; though he was billed as a main actor on some film posters, including his villainous role as "The Mask" in the popular 1942 12-episode movie serial, Spy Smasher.  Generally, the Screen Actors Guild for film, and AFTRA for TV and radio, establishes the guidelines for credits. The lack of crediting can be for several reasons, such as (i) small roles, (ii) non-speaking roles, (iii) brevity, (iv) perceived mismatch between the actor and the role (e.g., a famous actor playing an insignificant part), (v) cameos, (vi) extras, (vii) bit part roles. But also, from 1933 until after World War II, film credits for German-expatriates and German-American actors, particularly in Nazi-themed films, was risky for those who had families in Nazi-occupied countries, not only for Jews, but for anyone with American ties that might draw the attention of the SS. Schumm's paternal and maternal relatives were German citizens and resided there.  Schumm became a U.S. naturalized citizen February 14, 1941. When Schumm was drafted under the U.S. Selective Service System, he became a conscientious objector.

In a 2015 retrospective review of Schumm's role as "The Mask" from the 1942 serial Spy Smasher, film critic Boyd P. Magers wrote, "the ultimate screen Nazi was Hans Schumm."  An IMDb biographer characterized Schumm as "Nazi swine .  Magers pointed out that Schumm's career received a considerable boost in the early 1940s when German-born actors were sought, particularly for roles in anti-Nazi films portraying members of the Wehrmacht and SS.

Schumm played a character role in the 1943 film, Hangmen. The film was one of the few attempts by German immigrants in the United States to make a film against the Hitler regime.

Post World War II 
After World War II, Schumm performed a role in a 1952-1953 Broadway play, A Red Rainbow.

Germany 
Following a trend beginning around 1953 for American film producers to shoot in West Germany due to low costs, Schumm traveled to West Germany for work, including roles in:

 The Trapp Family
 The Third Sex (Das dritte Geschlecht) was filmed in Germany in 1957 and released in its original edition in Vienna
 Tales of the Vikings (39 episodes), produced in Munich by Kirk Douglas, Schumm played Thorvald in two episodes
 Question 7
 The Bashful Elephant
 Come Fly with Me
 Captain Sindbad, shot at Bavaria Film Studios
 The Waltz King (1963)
 Before Winter Comes
 Komm nach Wien, ich zeig dir was! (Come to Vienna, I'll Show You Something!)

The Third Sex was produced in West Germany.  It was filmed from May 8 to June 3, 1957, and premiered in Vienna on August 29, 1957, in several cinemas. In Germany, the film was first seen in Stuttgart at the Gloria-Palast on October 31, 1957.  Schumm played a pediatric psychologist.  The film addressed homosexuality, which was controversial at the time. The underlying message, conversion therapy, is on the wrong side of science. Directed by Veit Harlan, the aim was to liberalize public views against homosexuality, and in particular, influence reform of West German laws against it.  The film – specifically the version censored by German authorities under Paragraph 175 of the German Criminal Code – had the opposite effect.

Hollywood in the 1960s 

Schumm returned to Hollywood and finished his acting career in 1970.

After shooting Das dritte Geschlecht, Schumm returned to Hollywood and finished his acting career in 1970.

Representation and management 
Schumm was represented by Paul Kohner.

Family and marriages

Birth
Schumm was born April 2, 1896, in Stuttgart, Germany, to Friedrich Schumm (1855–1904) and Petronella (aka Petrauella) Jehle (maiden, aka Yehle aka Fehle; 1855–1936).  He had three siblings – two brothers and a sister.  His older brother, Gustav "Gustel" Schumm (de) (1888–1966) had been a star rugby and soccer player, and in 1912, for one year, had served as president of VfB Stuttgart and is credited for developing youth soccer in Germany, before and after World War I.

First marriage
Schumm first married – on July 29, 1931, in Los Angeles – Agnes Mellen Kent (1888–1975), who from a previous marriage, had two daughters – (i) Jessie Marcellina (Elizabeth) Olivieri (1918–1947) and (ii) Josephine Tarquini (1910–2010), that latter having been adopted after being rescued from the 1915 earthquake in central Italy. Agnes Kent was the daughter of New York architect William Winthrop Kent (1860–1955) – who, as architect, was affiliated at various times with (i) Harvey L. Page, (ii) his brother, Edward Austin Kent (who perished on the Titanic), (iii) Heins & LaFarge, and (iv) Jardine, Kent & Jardine.  He was one of the architects of the original plan for Cathedral of St. John the Divine, including the Romanesque Revival apse.  Agnes was also the granddaughter of Henry Mellen Kent (1823–1894), one of the founders of the Flint & Kent department store in Buffalo.  Hans and Agnes divorced. Agnes had been previously married to Umberto Olivieri (1884–1973), a banker for 14 years at Bank of America in San Francisco, a lawyer in Rome, and a language professor for 30 years at Santa Clara University, who, in 1958, at the age of 74 — after returning to Italy and joining the Order of Saint Benedict at the Subiaco Monastery in Rome — became ordained as a Roman Catholic Priest by the Bishop of Tivoli at Subiaco.  Hans Schumm was Agnes' second of three husbands.

Second marriage
Schumm then married – on September 23, 1935, in Santa Ana, California – Gloria F. Smith (aka Gloria Smith Beery, née Florence W. Smith; 1916–1989). Gloria Schumm filed for divorce late September 1943 in Los Angeles County.  Their divorced became final on December 8, 1944.  Gloria and Hans then remarried August 21, 1947, after Gloria realized that she was pregnant from, she claimed, actor Wallace Beery, which Beery denied.  Gloria gave birth on February 7, 1948, to Johan Richard Wallace Schumm.  On February 13, 1948, Gloria Schumm, on behalf of Johan Schumm, as plaintiff, filed a paternity suit against Beery, who, through his lawyer, Norman Ronald Tyre (1910–2002) – Gang, Tyre, Ramer & Brown – initially offered $6,000 as a settlement, but denied being the father.

Gloria Schumm, again, filed for divorced from Hans Schumm on April 2, 1953, in Los Angeles County. Gloria, in her private life, sometimes used Wallace Beery's surname and, as a bit part actor, sometimes used her stage name, Gloria Whitney.  Gloria, again, divorced Hans Schumm January 11, 1978, in Los Angeles County.

United States citizenship 
Schumm applied to become a naturalized citizen of the United States on November 13, 1940, in Los Angeles, and was admitted as a citizen February 14, 1941. The two affiants attesting to Schumm's identity and residency were Stuttgart-born Alfred Theodor Hummel (1876–1946) and John Harrison Rodney Pain (1884–1966), a British-born American gardner and woodwork artisan.

Death 
He was dead on arrival at Kaiser Permanente Hospital in Los Angeles from heart failure after being stricken at the Hollywood nursing home where he had been living. His body was cremated with his ashes buried in the actors’ rose garden at Westwood Village Memorial Park Cemetery.

Links to stills 
 Three stills from "The Primitive Touch," a TV episode from The Web; CBS/Getty Images, May 14, 1954 New York, New York
 Joe Maross, Hans Josef Schumm, and Elizabeth Fraser:
 Getty image 625765216
 Getty image 625765116
 Getty image 625765174
 Two images: April 17, 1952, Johann Schumm – 4 years (child); Gloria Schumm (mother); University of Southern California;

Profession affiliations 
 Screen Actors Guild, member
 Screen Extras Guild (between 1946 and 1992, background actors in film and television were largely represented by the Screen Extras Guild. SEG was disbanded on 1 June 1992 and transferred its jurisdiction to SAG)
 Edwin Forrest Society, The Actors Fund, member (estate benefactor)

Selected cinematic and TV clips 
 Anders als du und ich (§ 175)
 Psychologist (Hans Schumm), Christa Teichmann, Klaus' mother (Paula Wessely), Werner Teichmann, Klaus' father (Paul Dahlke)
 Scene: "Cure for Homosexuality," Klause's parents with the psychologist (German censored version with English subtitles)

 Casbah
  Anton Duval (Houseley Stevenson), Willem (Hans Schumm as Andre Pola), Pepe (Tony Martin)
 Scene

 Spy Smasher on YouTube (all 12 chapters)

Filmography

Television

Stage

Radio

Notes and references

General resources 

 Marta Mierendorff papers 0214 "Schumm, Hans," Box 12, Folder 22, University of Southern California (USC), Feuchtwanger Memorial Library; 
 Marta Mierendorff, PhD — a German-born scholar who, in the latter 1960s, became a faculty member at USC — was a pioneer in the study of exiles. Schumm was not an exile, but, the papers include information on Schumm

 Paul Kohner Agency records, Goose Step, Oscars collections, Margaret Herrick Library
 Deutsches Bühnen-Jahrbuch; Theatergeschichtliches Jahr- und Adressbuch, Berlin: F.A. Günther & Sohn Actien-Gesellschaft, Vol. 42 (1931); ; 
 "Arbeitsausschüsse der Fachschaft Bühne," Die Bühne (Redakteur: Dr. Hans Knudsen), 2 Jahrgang, heft 1, 1. Januar 1936, seit 22; 
 O – Obmann; St – Obmann Stellvertreter; S – Schriftführer; K – Kassenwart; Vd – Vertrauens -dame; B – Beisitzer; FV – Fachgruppenvertreter.
 Bamberg Stadttheater: Walter Storm (O), Fritz Milter (St), Hans Schumm (S), Karl Frank (K), Ria Mardeck (Vd).

  ; .
<li> 
<li> 
 See inline citation 21 for Chapter 5 on p. 504. →   ; ; .
 Vol. 1: A–L
 Vol. 2: M-Z

Notes

Books, periodicals, collections, academic works

Newspapers

External links 
 
 
 
  (biography by Hans J. Wollstein)
 Hans Schumm at AFI Catalog of Feature Films
 Hans Schumm at Česko-Slovenská filmová databáze (cs)
 Hans Schumm biography, filmography and photos at filmportal.de

1896 births
1990 deaths
American male film actors
German male film actors
American male stage actors
German male stage actors
American male television actors
20th-century American male actors
20th-century German male actors
German emigrants to the United States
Male actors from Stuttgart
People with acquired American citizenship
American conscientious objectors
Burials at Westwood Village Memorial Park Cemetery